Saku Vesterinen (born February 28, 1999) is a Finnish professional ice hockey defenceman currently playing for IPK on loan from KalPa.

Vesterinen played junior hockey with the Charlottetown Islanders of the Quebec Major Junior Hockey League for two seasons between 2016 and 2018. He made his Liiga debut for KalPa on September 21, 2018, against JYP.

References

External links

1999 births
Living people
Charlottetown Islanders players
Finnish ice hockey defencemen
Iisalmen Peli-Karhut players
KalPa players
People from Siilinjärvi
Sportspeople from North Savo